Madagascar Kartz is a racing game based on DreamWorks Animation's Madagascar. It was released in 2009 for all seventh-generation platforms except the PlayStation Portable, as the second game on Madagascars spin-off series. The Nintendo DS version was re-released as a multicart that also includes Shrek's Carnival Craze Party Games.

A crossover sequel, DreamWorks Super Star Kartz, developed by High Impact Games, was released in 2011 for the same platforms, plus the Nintendo 3DS.  It features a more diverse mix of Dreamworks characters, including a few returning Madagascar characters.

Gameplay
The game is a kart racing game, and the player can perform jumps, flips, and rolls. There are many different stages from scenes of the franchise. A Madagascar Kartz themed Wheel controller accessory was optionally bundled with the Wii version of the game.

Playable characters include Alex the Lion, Marty the Zebra, Melman the Giraffe, Gloria the Hippopotamus, The Penguins, The Chimps, and King Julien from the Madagascar films. Two characters from other movies are included alongside the Madagascar characters, Shrek from Shrek, and B.O.B. from Monsters vs. Aliens, all DreamWorks Animation franchises. Race types include Quick Race, Championship, Time Trial and Checkpoint race. A Championship race is one where the player collects mangoes and tries to finish first place in order to unlock higher speed classes (50cc, 100cc, 150cc, 200cc, the last one is raced in reverse direction/mirror mode), more karts and tracks. In Time Trial, players beat their own times and earn medals (gold, silver and bronze). In Checkpoint Race, players collect as many hourglasses as they can before the time runs out. There are several tracks in the game, most of which have 2 shortcuts. "I Like to Move It", sung by Reel 2 Real, is the menu theme.

Reception

Madagascar Kartz received "mixed or average" reviews on all platforms according to the review aggregation website Metacritic. Nintendo Gamer gave the Wii version a score of 41%, seven months after the game's release.

References

External links
 

2009 video games
Activision games
Crossover racing games
Kart racing video games
Madagascar (franchise) video games
Multiplayer and single-player video games
Nintendo DS games
PlayStation 3 games
Video games developed in New Zealand
Video games set in Africa
Video games set in New York City
Video games set in Madagascar
Wii games
Wii Wheel games
Xbox 360 games
Sidhe (company) games
Virtuos games